William Goring may refer to:
William Goring (cricketer), English cricketer 
William Goring (by 1500-54), MP for Sussex
Sir William Goring, 1st Baronet (died 1658) of the Goring baronets, MP for Sussex
Sir William Goring, 3rd Baronet (c. 1659–1724), of the Goring baronets
Sir William Burton Nigel Goring, 13th Baronet (born 1933), of the Goring baronets